František Hala (9 March 1905 – 9 June 1965) was a Czech wrestler. He competed in the men's Greco-Roman middleweight at the 1928 Summer Olympics.

References

External links
 

1905 births
1965 deaths
Czech male sport wrestlers
Olympic wrestlers of Czechoslovakia
Wrestlers at the 1928 Summer Olympics
Place of birth missing